"I Do You" is a song by the American sibling group, The Jets. It was written by Rick Kelly and Linda Mallah.

Released as the second single from The Jets' multi-platinum album Magic, the song was somewhat successful on the Billboard Hot 100 chart, where it reached number 20. It reached number 19 on the R&B chart.

Music video
The official music video was directed by Stephen E. Rivkin.

Chart performance

References

1987 singles
The Jets (band) songs
Dance-pop songs
1987 songs
MCA Records singles